"Where or When" is a show tune from the 1937 Rodgers and Hart musical Babes in Arms. It was first performed by Ray Heatherton and Mitzi Green. That same year, Hal Kemp recorded a popular version. The song also appeared in the film version of Babes in Arms two years later.

Babes in Arms
"Where or When" is the first number to appear in the original Broadway production of Babes in Arms. The musical opens in fictional Seaport, Long Island on a hectic morning that finds most of the adult population embarking on a five-month vaudeville tour. Soon after his parents' departure, 20-year-old Valentine LaMar (played by Ray Heatherton) discovers at his doorstep a young hitchhiker named Billie Smith (played by Mitzi Green). Instantly smitten, he engages her in a discussion of movie stars, self-defense maneuvers, and Nietzsche's theory of individualism, at which point Val impulsively steals a kiss. Both admit to a powerful sense of déjà vu and sing "Where or When" as a duet. 

MGM bought the screen rights to the play in 1938, and the following year the studio released Babes in Arms, starring Mickey Rooney and Judy Garland. The picture bore little resemblance to its stage predecessor, with the characters and plot substantially revised by 10 studio writers, and only two numbers being retained from the score. "Where or When" appeared 37 minutes into the film, sung in a duet by Betty Jaynes and Douglas McPhail, and partially reprised solo by Garland.

Lyrics
The lyrics of Where or When illustrate a memory phenomenon known as déjà vu. The line "Some things that happened for the first time...", as interpreted by artists such as Ella Fitzgerald is sung as "Some things that happen for the first time...," which gives it a somewhat different meaning. 

Ultimately, the uncertainty of whether the couple had met before is never resolved in the lyrics, just wistfully chalked up to "tricks that your mind can play" in the final line of the second verse, which is not often recorded:

It seems we stood and talked like this, before
We looked at each other in the same way then
But I can't remember where or when

The clothes you're wearing are the clothes you wore
The smile you are smiling you were smiling then
But I can't remember where or when

Some things that happened for the first time
Seem to be happening again
And so it seems that we have met before
And laughed before, and loved before
But who knows where or when

Some things that happened for the first time
Seem to be happening again
And so it seems that we have met before
And laughed before, and loved before
But who knows where or when

When you're awake, the things you think
Come from the dreams you dream.
Thought has wings, and lots of things
Are seldom what they seem.
Sometimes you think you've lived before

All that you live today.
Things you do come back to you,
As though they knew the way.
Oh, the tricks your mind can play.

Recorded versions
Where or When has become part of the Great American Songbook, having been recorded by scores of popular artists over the decades, starting with a successful cover by Hal Kemp and his Orchestra shortly after its debut in 1937.

Other memorable recordings include those by  Douglas McPhail, Betty Jaynes, and Judy Garland in the 1939 MGM musical Babes in Arms, Peggy Lee and the Benny Goodman Sextet in 1941, Lena Horne in 1948, and Ella Fitzgerald in 1956.  Frank Sinatra recorded it three times, in 1941, 1958, and 1966, and Dean Martin is credited with numerous interpretations.  Instrumental versions were recorded by Count Basie, Dave Brubeck,  Duke Ellington, and others, and a doo-wop 45 rpm single by Dion & The Belmonts in 1960.

More contemporary interpretations have been done by Harry Connick Jr., George Michael,  Mandy Patinkin, and Diana Krall.

See also
 Where Or When (film), a film inspired by the song

References

1937 songs
1960 singles
1963 singles
Pop standards
Songs from Babes in Arms
Songs with music by Richard Rodgers
Songs with lyrics by Lorenz Hart
Dion DiMucci songs
The Lettermen songs
Lena Horne songs
Barbra Streisand songs
Andy Williams songs
Caterina Valente songs
Laurie Records singles
Dave Edmunds songs